Patrick Lindsey (born April 22, 1982) is an American racing driver, team owner and businessman. Outside racing, he serves as president of the air transport company Mira Vista Aviation.

Career 
Lindsey's started his motorsport career in Bakersfield, California, where he used an old race truck in a drag race. In 2013, he drove together with his teammate Patrick Long in the Rolex Sports Car Series on a Porsche 997.

FIA World Endurance Championship
In the 2018-19 FIA WEC season, Lindsey drove for the Team Project 1 on a Porsche 911 GT3 RSR. At the 2018 24 Hours of Le Mans, he raced alongside his teammates Jörg Bergmeister and Egidio Perfetti. Lindsey, Bergmeister, and Perfetti won the 6 Hours of Fuji in the LMGTE Am category. They also won the 2019 24 Hours of Le Mans in the same category, clinching the LMGTE Am championship in the process.

Lindsey returned to the FIA WEC in 2022 season, representing Dempsey-Proton Racing.

Racing record

Complete 24 Hours of Le Mans results

Complete FIA World Endurance Championship results
(key) (Races in bold indicate pole position; races in
italics indicate fastest lap)

* Season still in progress.

IMSA SportsCar Championship results
(key)

References

External links

1982 births
Living people
Sportspeople from Dallas
Racing drivers from Dallas
Racing drivers from Texas
American racing drivers
12 Hours of Sebring drivers
24 Hours of Daytona drivers
24 Hours of Le Mans drivers
FIA World Endurance Championship drivers
Rolex Sports Car Series drivers
WeatherTech SportsCar Championship drivers
Porsche Carrera Cup Germany drivers